The 2015–16 UCF Knights women's basketball team will represent the University of Central Florida during the 2015–16 NCAA Division I basketball season. The Knights compete in Division I of the National Collegiate Athletic Association (NCAA) and the American Athletic Conference (The American). The Knights, in the program's 39th season of basketball, are led by ninth-year head coach Joi Williams, and play their home games at the CFE Arena on the university's main campus in Orlando, Florida. They finished the season 7–23, 4–14 in AAC play to finish in a tie for ninth place. They lost in the first round of the American Athletic women's tournament to SMU.

On March 7, 2016, following UCF's third consecutive first round loss in the conference tournament, Joi Williams was fired after serving as head coach for 9 years. Williams finished her record at UCF, 114-163 overall and 59-91 in conference play.

Media
All UCF games will have an audio or video broadcast available. For conference play, UCF games will typically be available on ESPN3, AAC Digital, or UCF Knights All-Access. Road games not on ESPN3 or AAC Digital will have an audio broadcast available on the UCF Portal. All non-conference home games will be streamed exclusively on UCF Knights All-Access. Select non-conference road games will have a stream available through the opponents website. The audio broadcast for home games will only be available through UCF Knights All-Access.

Roster

Schedule and results

|-
!colspan=12 style="background:#000000; color:#BC9B6A;"| Non-conference regular season

|-
!colspan=12 style="background:#000000; color:#BC9B6A;"| AAC regular season

|-
!colspan=12 style="background:#000000; color:#BC9B6A;"| American Athletic Conference Women's Tournament

|-

See also
 2015–16 UCF Knights men's basketball team

References

UCF
UCF Knights women's basketball seasons
UCF Knights
UCF Knights